Holly-Jane Rahlens (born 1950) is an American writer, journalist and entertainer living in Berlin, Germany. She is best known for her personal essays that were broadcast on German radio in the 1990s and performed for the stage, her “future fiction” novel Infinitissimo, written in English, but first published in German as Everlasting — Der Mann, der aus der Zeit fiel,  and her award-winning coming-of-age novel, Prince William, Maximilian Minsky and Me, about a  young Jewish girl living in today's Berlin.

Life and career 
Holly-Jane Rahlens, a born New Yorker, United States of America, grew up in Brooklyn and Queens and graduated from Queens College (City University of New York) where she studied Theater and English. She moved to Berlin, Germany, soon after, where she has lived virtually all her adult life. While remaining an American citizen, she has flourished in the German media world, working in radio, television, and film as an actress, producer, and commentator, and creating a series of highly praised one-woman shows. She writes fiction for readers of all ages. In 2003 her first novel for teens, Prince William, Maximilian Minsky and Me, earned the prestigious Deutscher Jugendliteraturpreis as the best young adult novel published in Germany that year. The audio book, narrated by the author herself in German, was on the Preis der Deutschen Schallplattenkritik Best List in 2003. Soon after, the novel was published in its original English by Candlewick Press. In 2006 the Association of Jewish Libraries named it a Sydney Taylor Honor Book. It has since been translated into nine other languages and was adapted in 2007 into the motion picture Max Minsky and Me (screenplay: Holly-Jane Rahlens), which has garnered praise and awards around the world.

Major works 
Screenplays:
 Eines schönen Tages, 1989
 Max Minsky und ich, 2007, (English: Max Minsky and Me)
Adult Novels:
 Becky Bernstein Goes Berlin, (1996 Piper Verlag, English: 1997 Arcade)
 Mazel Tov in Las Vegas (1997 Piper Verlag)
All-Age Books
 Mauerblümchen (2009, Rowohlt Verlag, English: Wallflower, 2010, Berlinica)
 Everlasting – Der Mann, der aus der Zeit fiel (2012, Wunderlich/Rowohlt, English: Infinitissimo – The Man Who Fell Through Time, 2017, Rowohlt/rororo)
Young Adult
 Prinz William, Maximilian Minsky und ich (2002, Rowohlt Verlag, English: Prince William, Maximilian Minsky and Me, 2005, Candlewick Press)
 Wie man richtig küsst (2005, Beltz & Gelberg, English: How to Really Kiss, 2007, Beltz & Gelberg)
 Mein kleines großes Leben (2008)
Children's Books
 Stella Menzel und der goldene Faden (2013, Rowohlt Verlag)
 Blätterrauschen (2015, Rowohlt Verlag)
 Federflüstern (2016, Rowohlt Verlag)

References

External links
 http://www.holly-jane-rahlens.com
 http://www.tabletmag.com/jewish-arts-and-culture/books/878/princess-for-a-day
 https://www.kirkusreviews.com/book-reviews/holly-jane-rahlens-2/becky-bernstein-goes-berlin-2/
 http://www.jewishbookcouncil.org/book/prince-william-maximilian-minsky-and-me

1950 births
Living people
Rundfunk im amerikanischen Sektor people
20th-century American women writers
20th-century American novelists
21st-century American women writers
21st-century American novelists
American women novelists
American children's writers